Branimir Brstina (born 4 January 1960) is a Serbian actor.

References

External links
 

1960 births
Living people
People from Kikinda
Serbian male television actors
Serbian male film actors
Zoran Radmilović Award winners